Drosophila subsilvestris is a relatively common Northern European species of fruit flies from the family Drosophilidae. It is associated with woodland. It is in flight from April to November, being most abundant in June and July, and in September and October.

References 

subsilvestris
Muscomorph flies of Europe